The State Correctional Institution – Rockview, commonly referred to as SCI Rockview, is a Pennsylvania Department of Corrections prison located in Benner Township, Pennsylvania,  away from Bellefonte. A portion of the prison grounds extends into College Township.

SCI Rockview, which began construction in 1912 and was completed in 1915, was intended to replace Eastern State Penitentiary and Western Penitentiary. Instead it became a branch prison of Western housing lesser security risk prisoners employed in the extensive farm program outside the gates. Rockview is now a medium-security institution for men. Pennsylvania's execution chamber is located on the grounds of Rockview; however, there is no "death row" there. Condemned prisoners are transported to Rockview from death rows in maximum security prisons across the state several days before their scheduled execution.

SCI – Benner Township was constructed adjacent to SCI Rockview in 2010.

History

Construction of Rockview began in 1912, and the prison opened three years later in 1915. In 1913, the Pennsylvania State Legislature approved electrocution and the electric chair took the place of the gallows.

At that time, the Pennsylvania State Legislature selected the new Western Penitentiary in Centre County, now known as Rockview, as the location of the chair. Neither the chair nor the institution were ready for occupancy until 1915.

Between 1915 and 1962, 348 men and two women died in Pennsylvania's electric chair. The first woman to die in the electric chair was Irene Crawford Schroeder aka Shrader February 23, 1931.  In 1972, the Pennsylvania Supreme Court decision Commonwealth v. Bradley invalidated the administration of the death penalty. In 1974, Pennsylvania drafted new capital punishment legislation, but it was once again invalidated in 1977. The next year, yet again, new capital punishment legislation was drafted and signed into law.

On November 29, 1990, amidst debate over whether electrocution was cruel and unusual punishment, the Pennsylvania State Legislature barred further such executions and lethal injection was approved.

The film On The Yard (1978) was filmed entirely at this prison and used actual inmates as extras in the film. It stars John Heard, Thomas Waites, and Mike Kellin.

Execution chamber
Since June 1997, the state execution chamber has been located in a two-story former field hospital located on the prison grounds outside of the perimeter of the main Rockview SCI facility. The hospital was renovated into a maximum security building that houses the execution chamber and a holding area for death row inmates. This allows officials to prepare for and implement an execution without disrupting the operations of the main Rockview facility. In addition, witnesses do not have to enter the main facility to view an execution. The renovated building gained three cells with cell furniture, floor covering, telephones, an electronic monitoring system, and locking mechanisms. Materials transferred from the previous location include the bullet-proof glass room divider, the tables, and the chairs. The first floor houses the death chamber, while the second floor contains offices for other prison-related operations. It is nicknamed the "Death House".

Only three people, all of whom waived their appeals, have been executed in Pennsylvania since the resumption of capital punishment in 1976. All three executions took place at Rockview. The first was Keith Zettlemoyer in May 1995, followed by Leon Moser in August 1995, and then Gary M. Heidnik in July 1999.

Notable prisoners 

 George Feigley, escaped from SCI-Rockview in 1976.
 Rockne Warren Newell, Perpetrator of the Ross Township Municipal Building shooting.

See also

 List of Pennsylvania state prisons

References

External links
PA Dept of Corrections Web site
Yahoo movie "On The Yard" link

Rockview
Capital punishment in the United States
Buildings and structures in Centre County, Pennsylvania
Execution sites in the United States
1915 establishments in Pennsylvania